The 2006 Geelong Football Club season was the club's 107th season in the Australian Football League (AFL). Geelong finished the regular season in tenth position on the ladder, resulting in the club not qualifying for the finals.

News

Captains
 Captain: Steven King
 Vice-Captains: Cameron Ling, Tom Harley, Matthew Scarlett

Club list

Player list
 Players are listed in alphabetical order by surname, and statistics are for AFL regular season and finals series matches during the 2006 AFL season only.

Rookie list
 Players are listed in alphabetical order by surname, and statistics are for AFL regular season and finals series matches during the 2006 AFL season only.

 * Nominated rookie (Elevated to senior list during season, eligible for senior selection)

Changes from 2005 list

Additions

Deletions

Games

NAB Cup

Regular season

Ladder

Notes 
 Key

 Home match.
 Away match.

 General notes

See also
 2006 AFL Season
 Geelong Football Club

References

External links
Official Website of the Geelong Football Club
Official Website of the Australian Football League 

Geelong Football Club Season, 2006
Geelong Football Club seasons
Geelong Football Club Season, 2006